The Pharaoh's Secret is the thirteenth novel of Clive Cussler's NUMA Files series, published in 2015.

Kurt Austin and Joe Zavala go up against an Egyptian powerbroker.

Cameo
Kurt Austin and Joe Zavala meet up with Juan Cabrillo and other Oregon crew members in a museum warehouse in Malta. The Oregon Files book The Emperor's Revenge includes Juan's version of the same event.

2015 American novels
Novels by Clive Cussler
American adventure novels
G. P. Putnam's Sons books
The NUMA Files
Collaborative novels